The 2010–11 Swiss Super League was the 114th season of top-tier football in Switzerland. It began on 17 July 2010 and ended on 25 May 2011. The league comprised ten teams.

FC Basel successfully defended their league title, maintaining a one-point edge over runners-up FC Zürich at the end of the season. It was the 14th league title overall for the club.

Teams
FC Aarau were relegated after finishing in last place of the table after the 2009–10 season. They were replaced by 2009–10 Challenge League champions FC Thun.

Ninth-placed AC Bellinzona and Challenge League runners-up FC Lugano competed in a two-legged relegation play-off after the end of the 2009–10 season. Bellinzona won 2–1 on aggregate and thus retained their Super League spot.

Stadia and locations

League table

Results
Teams played each other four times over the course of the season, twice at home and twice away, for a total of 36 matches per team.

First half of season

Second half of season

Relegation play-offs
Bellinzona as 9th-placed Super League team played a two-legged play-off against 2010–11 Challenge League runners-up Servette.

Servette won 3–2 on aggregate.

Top goalscorers
Source:Swiss Football League

References

External links
 Super league website 
 soccerway.com

Swiss Super League seasons
Swiss
1